Viro stone cross denotes the location of a Viro tsässon ("chapel") in Viro village in Estonia. It is situated 1 kilometre from Meremäe village towards Obinitsa. This limestone cross from the 15th century is the only one remaining in the Meremäe rural municipality. Viro tsässon was a Passover Day tsässon.

History
The chapel that once stood at this location was dedicated to the Transfiguration of our Lord, a holiday celebrated on August 6th in Hilläkeste, Palandõ and Viro villages. In 1994, the walls of the building were still standing, but the roof had already fallen in. In spring of 2000, Priit Laanoja cleared the place from decayed logs and only a stone cross that was in the tsässon was left on the premises.

The Chapel
According to the data from the dispatch office of Friedrich R. Kreutzwald’s Memorial Museum, Viro tsässon was a building of horizontal beams with quadrangular layout. The beams were manually hacked by an axe and the floor was made from beams hacked in half. The roof was made from shingles and had a cross on it. By 1974, all that was left was the icon room, the entrance-room had been torn down earlier. The dimensions of tsässon: length 3.6 metres, width 3.4 metres and height 2.85 metres. V. Talumees believed that the stone cross that was in the tsässon dates back to the founding of Petseri monastery (15th-16th centuries). The cross has letters written on it that are unreadable.

The Cross
The dimensions of the cross are: height 1.3 metres, width 0.92 metres and thickness 0.3 metres.

References

Stone crosses in Continental Europe
Setomaa Parish